The Jilin Self-Defence Army was an anti-Japanese volunteer army formed in 1931 to defend local Chinese residents against the Japanese invasion of northeast China. General Ding Chao, Li Du, Feng Zhanhai, Xing Zhanqing, and Zhao Yi organised the Jilin Self-Defence Army in order to prevent the fall and occupation of Harbin city, Jilin province. This brought all their forces under a unified command. Calling for civilians to form volunteer units and join in the defense of the city, the army reached a strength of 30,000 men in six brigades of Zhang Xueliangs Northeastern army.

Jilin Self-Defense Corps – Commander-in-Chief Li Du
 Frontline commander-in-chief – Wang Yu 
 Chief of the general staff – Yang Yaojun
 Chinese Eastern Railroad Defense Army – Commander-in-Chief – Ding Chao
 28th Brigade – Ding Chao
 22nd Brigade – Zhao Yi
 25th Brigade – Ma Xianzhang
 26th Brigade – Song Wenjun
 29th Brigade – Wang Ruihua
 Temporary 1st Brigade – Feng Zhanhai
 1st Cavalry Brigade – Gong Changhai
 2nd Cavalry Brigade – Yao Dianchen
 Wooded Mountain Guerrilla Force – Song Xizeng

The defense of Harbin was at first successful and succeeded in repulsing the Manchukuo forces sent against them for a time. After its initial success, the army was forced out of Harbin when the Japanese sent their own troops under Jiro Tamon.
 
Ting Chao's beaten Jilin Self-Defence Army retired from Harbin and marched to the northeast down the Songhua River, to join the Lower Songhua garrison of General Li Du and together reorganized, swelling its ranks with volunteers to 30,000 men in nine brigades by April 1932. It continued to resist, occupying the towns along the eastern section of the Chinese Eastern Railway, between Harbin and the Soviet border. 

Feng Zhanhai, former regimental commander of the Jilin Guards Division, retreating from Harbin into the west of Jilin province raised a sizeable independent volunteer force, the Northeastern Loyal and Brave Army estimated by the Japanese as 15,000 men in June 1932.

See also
Pacification of Manchukuo
Second Sino-Japanese War

References
Coogan, Anthony, The volunteer armies of Northeast China, History Today; July 1993, Vol. 43 Issue 7, pp.36-41
Notes On A Guerrilla Campaign, from http://www.democraticunderground.com accessed November 4, 2006
 a more readable version here and some photos, from http://forum.axishistory.com, accessed November 4, 2006
 China's Anti-Japanese War combat operations 
 Author : Guo Rugui, editor-in-chief Huang Yuzhang 
 Press : Jiangsu People's Publishing House 
 Date published : 2005-7-1 
  
  第二部分：从“九一八”事变到西安事变哈尔滨保卫战

Anti-Japanese Volunteer Armies

Military units and formations established in 1932
Disbanded armies
History of Jilin